Lipschutz is a Jewish surname. It is a variant of Lifshitz.

Notable people with this surname
 Gerdi E. Lipschutz (1923–2010), New York politician
 S. Lipschütz (1863–1905), US chess champion
 Seymour Lipschutz (born 1931), American mathematician
 Dr. Lipschutz, a fictional character in the animated TV series: Rugrats

Jewish surnames